Wolfskuhlsee is a lake in the Mecklenburgische Seenplatte district in Mecklenburg-Vorpommern, Germany. At an elevation of 63.8 m, its surface area is 0.039 km².

Lakes of Mecklenburg-Western Pomerania
Waren (Müritz)